The Von Papen Cabinet formed the government of Weimar Republic between 1 June 1932 and 17 November 1932.

It countered a motion of no confidence in the Reichstag on 12 september 1932 by dissolving it during the vote on the motion; only DNVP and DVP supported the cabinet in the vote on the motion.

Composition
The Reich cabinet consisted of the following Ministers:

|-
| Vice-Chancellor of the German Reich
| style="text-align:center" colspan=5| Vacant

References

External links
 

Papen
Papen
Papen
Papen
Cabinet